PKP class Ok22 is a class of ordinary passenger (O) 4-6-0 (k) steam locomotive designed in 1922 for
Polskie Koleje Państwowe (Polish State Railways, PKP). It was the first locomotive designed in Poland after World War I, so the design work was done jointly with Hanomag, based on the Prussian P 8 (PKP class Ok1)

History

Introduction
The first five engines were built in Germany by Hanomag in 1923. Polish production started in 1928 and lasted until 1934 after which 185 locomotives had been manufactured by Fablok in Chrzanów.  The first Polish-built locomotive (Ok22-6) was ready on December 31, 1928. Polish versions of the locomotive bore some improvements and changes compared with German ones, and were similar to PKP class Ty23. Ok22 locomotives were the first on the PKP to be equipped with electric lights.

Wartime
After the German invasion of Poland in World War II, most Ok22 locomotives were taken into the Deutsche Reichsbahn fleet as 38 4501 to 38 4630.

Present day
Only two examples have survived. Ok22-23 in Jaworzyna Śląska and Ok22-31 in Wolsztyn. Ok22-31 was an operational engine. It ran until 1997, and after retirement became a stationary exhibit. In 2004 the machine was restored to working order again, and it ran until 2009. It is currently static.

See also
PKP classification system

References

 
 

Ok22
4-6-0 locomotives
Railway locomotives introduced in 1923
Fablok locomotives
Hanomag locomotives
Standard gauge locomotives of Poland

Passenger locomotives